Action for Slander is a 1937 British drama film directed by Tim Whelan and starring Clive Brook, Ann Todd and Googie Withers. The plot is about an army officer who is falsely accused at cheating at cards by a man whose wife he had an affair with and struggles to clear his name. It was an adaptation of the 1937 novel Action for Slander by Mary Borden.

Plot
Major George Daviot is left by his wife Ann due to their growing estrangement and her knowledge that he has fallen in love with another woman, Josie Bradford, the wife of one of his fellow officers. Daviot goes off with friends for a weekend party at a country house attended by a number of prominent figures including businessmen and politicians as well as Captain Bradford and his wife. The tension between Bradford and Daviot is obvious during grouse shooting as Bradford is clearly aware of Daviot's affair with his wife.

That evening, during a game of cards played for high stakes, Daviot is accused of cheating by Grant, a drunken player who has lost large amounts of money, a charge that is dismissed out of hand by the other players until Bradford seconds it. None of the other players believe the accusation, even though they are unaware of the grudge that Bradford has against Daviot. Bradford sticks to his story, even in the face of legal action from Daviot.

The other guests frightened of their own reputations if the scandal becomes widely known, persuade all to hush the matter up. Daviot agrees to keep quiet for all their sakes, even though he still wants to clear his name. Daviot proposes to Josie that she leave her husband and live with him in spite of the scandal, but her lukewarm response leads him to realise that her interest in him is shallow. She subsequently reconciles with her husband and they go abroad to spend time together.

Daviot tries to continue, but rumours about the affair begin to spread. Over the following year, his life disintegrates. He no longer finds himself welcome in  his regiment or at his gentlemen's club and his friends begin to cut him socially, including those at the house party who know him to be innocent. Hounded out of his society, Daviot retreats to a cheap boarding house in Bayswater where he ceases to go out or even open letters. His one remaining hope, of receiving a transfer to the Indian Army serving on the Northwest Frontier is dashed and he begins to consider suicide.

Ann Daviot, meanwhile, has been touring around Continental Europe aimlessly, possibly never to return to Britain. As soon as she hears he is in trouble she returns to help him, but he is unresponsive and derides her as an "Angel of Mercy". Eventually she goads him into facing his accusers, and he initiates court proceedings on the understanding that if he loses he will be allowed to take gentlemen's way out with a pistol. With the help of his barrister Sir Quinton Jessops, Daviot attempts to clear his name by suing Bradford and Grant for slander.

Cast
 Clive Brook as Major George Daviot
 Ann Todd as Ann Daviot
 Margaretta Scott as Josie Bradford
 Arthur Margetson as Captain Hugh Bradford
 Ronald Squire as Charles Cinderford
 Athole Stewart as Lord Pontefract
 Percy Marmont as William Cowbit
 Frank Cellier as Sir Bernard Roper
 Anthony Holles as John Grant
 Morton Selten as Judge Trotter
 Kate Cutler as The Dowager
 Enid Stamp-Taylor as Jenny
 Francis L. Sullivan as Sir Quinton Jessops
 Felix Aylmer as Sir Eustace Cunninghame
 Laurence Hanray as Clerk of Court
 Gus McNaughton as Tandy
 Googie Withers as Mary
 Albert Whelan as Roper's butler
 Allan Jeayes as Colonel
 Pauline de Chalus as Polly
 Edward Lexy as Collins (Porter)

Production
The film was made independently at Denham Studios by Victor Saville with backing from Alexander Korda's London Film Productions. It was adapted from the novel Action for Slander by Mary Borden that was released the same year.

Reception
The film was popular at its release and it was re-released several times during the 1940s. However, it has later been criticised as "stilted". Rachael Low describes it as being "well-made and acted" although the "behaviour of the characters was too far-fetched to carry conviction".

Writing for Night and Day in 1937, Graham Greene gave the film a mildly good review, summarizing the film as "a picture of which we needn't feel ashamed if it reaches the United States, even though the story is novelettish in the extreme". Despite expressing the view that Selten had been "badly miscast" for the role of the Judge, Greene generally praised the cast's acting and the direction which allowed "people on the whole [to] behave naturally - and shabbily", and noted that the "love scene for once is not written in".

References

External links

Bibliography
 Low, Rachael. The History of British Film: Volume VII. Routledge, 1997.
 White, Terry. Justice Denoted: The Legal Thriller in American, British, and Continental Courtroom Literature. Praeger, 2003.

1937 drama films
1937 films
British drama films
Films directed by Tim Whelan
Films based on British novels
Films produced by Alexander Korda
Films with screenplays by Ian Dalrymple
Adultery in films
Films produced by Victor Saville
Films set in London
Films set in Paris
British courtroom films
British films about gambling
London Films films
United Artists films
Films shot at Denham Film Studios
British black-and-white films
1930s English-language films
1930s British films